Konstantinos "Dinos" Mitoglou (Greek: Κωνσταντίνος "Ντίνος" Μήτογλου; born June 11, 1996) is a Greek professional basketball player who last played for Olimpia Milano of the Italian Lega Basket Serie A and the EuroLeague. He played college basketball at Wake Forest University. He is a 2.10 m (6' 10") tall power forward, who can occasionally play as a center.

Early career
After playing with the youth teams of the Greek clubs Asteria Academy and Aris, Mitoglou played for the first time in Greece's top-tier level, the Greek Basket League, with the senior men's team of Aris Thessaloniki, during the 2013–14 season. He made his debut in the Greek Basket League, on 30 November 2013, in a game against Olympiacos. With Aris, he played in a total of 3 games, during the Greek Basket League 2013–14 season.

Despite playing in Greece's top-tier level professional basketball league, Mitoglou was able to retain his amateur status, thus making him eligible to play college basketball.

College career
Mitoglou played 3 years of NCAA Division I college basketball at Wake Forest from 2014 to 2017. In 3 years at Wake Forest, he appeared in 96 games, of which 75 were starts, and averaged 9.3 points and 5.4 rebounds per game.

College statistics

|-
| style="text-align:left;"| 2014–15
| style="text-align:left;"| Wake Forest
| 32 || 13  || 22.3 || .442 || .385 || .718 || 4.6 || 0.4 || 0.5 || 0.6 || 9.7
|-
| style="text-align:left;"| 2015–16
| style="text-align:left;"| Wake Forest
| 31 || 30  || 23.8 || .427 || .318 || .767 || 5.4 || 0.7 || 0.5 || 0.8 || 9.2
|-
| style="text-align:left;"| 2016–17
| style="text-align:left;"| Wake Forest
| 33 || 32  || 24.6 || .421 || .333 || .800 || 6.1 || 0.9 || 0.6 || 0.7 || 8.9
|-
|- class="sortbottom"
| style="text-align:center;" colspan=2| Career
| 96 || 75 || 23.6 || .430 || .347 || .766 || 5.4 || 0.7 || 0.5 || 0.7 || 9.3

Professional career
Mitoglou played with the Greek Basket League club Aris, during the 2013–14 season. He then moved to Wake Forest University, but Aris retained his club rights, through the year 2017. Mitoglou spent the next 3 seasons playing D1 college basketball. He left Wake Forest after his junior season, to turn professional.

After leaving Wake Forest, Mitoglou signed a 4-year contract with the Greek club Panathinaikos. The contract was worth $2 million in net income.

On June 25, 2021, Mitoglou officially signed a two-year deal with Italian club Olimpia Milano worth 1.8 million Euros. 

Since March of 2022, Mitoglou has been involved in a major doping scandal involving unlicensed pharmaceuticals. On March 9, 2023, Dinos Mitoglou officially received a 32-month suspension from FIBA.

National team career

Greek junior national team
Mitoglou played with the junior national teams of Greece. With Greece's junior national teams, he played at the 2012 FIBA Europe Under-16 Championship, the 2013 FIBA Europe Under-18 Championship, the 2014 FIBA Europe Under-18 Championship, and the 2015 FIBA Under-19 World Cup.

Greek senior national team
Mitoglou became a member of the senior Greek national basketball team in 2017. He played at the 2019 FIBA World Cup qualification.

Career statistics

EuroLeague

|-
| align="left" | 2017–18
| align="left" rowspan=4| Panathinaikos
| 4 || 0 || 3.1 || .000 || .000 || .500 || .5 || .0 || .3 || .3 || .8 || .5
|-
| align="left" | 2018–19 
| 27 || 10 || 13.4 || .622 || .200 || .550 || 3.3 || .3 || .3 || .2 || 4.2 || 4.0
|-
| align="left" | 2019–20
| 28 || 5 || 13.5 || .571 || .296 || .761 || 3.7 || .5 || .9 || .3 || 5.8 || 7.2
|-
| align="left" | 2020–21
| 34 || 23 || 20.2 || .504 || .295 || .713 || 5.4 || .9 || .7 || .3 || 9.3 || 11.3

Personal life
Mitoglou's father, Dimitrios Mitoglou, was a professional football player, that played with PAOK and Doxa Drama. His brother, Gerasimos Mitoglou is also a professional football player.

References

External links
Twitter 
Euroleague.net profile
FIBA profile
FIBA Europe profile
Eurobasket.com profile
Greek Basket League profile 
Hellenic Federation Profile 
Greek Basket League profile 
Draftexpress.com profile
Wake Forest Demon Deacons bio

1996 births
Living people
Aris B.C. players
Basketball players from Thessaloniki
Centers (basketball)
Greek expatriate basketball people in Italy
Greek expatriate basketball people in the United States
Greek men's basketball players
Olimpia Milano players
Panathinaikos B.C. players
Power forwards (basketball)
Wake Forest Demon Deacons men's basketball players